Maria Laura Almirão (born September 20, 1977 in São Paulo) is a Brazilian sprinter, who specialized in the 400 metres. She is a two-time Olympian and a five-time medalist for the 400 metres and sprint relay at the Ibero-American Championships.

Almirao qualified for the women's 400 metres at the 2004 Summer Olympics in Athens, by winning the gold medal from the Ibero-American Championships in Huelva, Spain. She finished fifth in the second heat of the event by six hundredths of a second (0.06) behind Jamaica's Nadia Davy, with a time of 52.10 seconds. Almirao eventually joined the national sprint team for the women's 4 × 400 m relay, along with her compatriots Josiane Tito, Lucimar Teodoro, and Geisa Coutinho. She and her team placed sixth on the second heat of the relay, for a seasonal best time of 3:28.43.

At the 2008 Summer Olympics in Beijing, Almirao competed again for the second time in individual and relay sprint events. For her first event, 400 metres, Almirao ran in the fourth heat against six other athletes, including Great Britain's Christine Ohuruogu, who eventually became an Olympic champion in the final. She finished the race again in fifth place by more than two seconds behind Ohuruogu, with a time of 53.26. Few days later, Almirao reunited with her teammates Lucimar Teodoro, Josiane Tito, and Emmily Pinheiro for the women's 4 × 400 m relay. She ran on the starting leg of the second heat, with an individual-split time of 53.49 seconds. Almirao and her team finished the relay in sixth place for a total time of 3:30.10, failing to advance into the final.

Almirao is also a full-time member of Associação Profissionalizante BMF in São Caetano do Sul, being coached and trained by Japanese-born Katsuhito Nakaya.

References

External links

Profile – UOL Esporte 
NBC 2008 Olympics profile

Brazilian female sprinters
Living people
Olympic athletes of Brazil
Athletes (track and field) at the 2004 Summer Olympics
Athletes (track and field) at the 2008 Summer Olympics
Athletes from São Paulo
1977 births
Pan American Games medalists in athletics (track and field)
Pan American Games bronze medalists for Brazil
Athletes (track and field) at the 2003 Pan American Games
Medalists at the 2003 Pan American Games
Olympic female sprinters
Universiade medalists in athletics (track and field)
Universiade silver medalists for Brazil
21st-century Brazilian women